Rajeev Kumar Goyle (born June 9, 1975) is a Democratic politician from Kansas, who represented the 87th District in the Kansas House of Representatives from 2007 to 2011.

Early life, education and career
Born in Cleveland, Ohio, Goyle and his parents resettled in Wichita, Kansas when he was 9 months old. His Indian parents, Vimal and Krishan Goyle, both doctors, immigrated to the United States from Bathinda in 1971.

His mother is an obstetrician and gynecologist and his father is a cardiologist who operates the Goyle Clinic in Wichita. When he was 15, Goyle was an organizer in a community-wide recycling program that removed hundreds of pounds of garbage from the county landfill and led to a cleanup of the Arkansas River in downtown Wichita. As a reporter for the Wichita Eagle, he worked with U.S.D. 259 to produce the annual ‘back-to-school’ issue and wrote a column on each high school in the city. At Wichita Collegiate School, he was active in sports, debate, and newspaper, and graduated as both valedictorian and student body president. He also interned on the Clinton/Gore presidential campaign in 1996.

Goyle attended Duke University where he was a member of a fraternity and was a student representative to a coalition of faculty and students aiming to improve working conditions on campus. He then went to Harvard Law School where he founded a small technology company with two classmates and where he was a member of the Harvard Legal Aid Bureau. Goyle is an attorney and a lecturer at Wichita State University.

Kansas House of Representatives
Goyle was a member of the following committees:
 Taxation
 Vision 2020
 Veterans, Military and Homeland Security (Ranking Member)
 Judiciary

Goyle wrote the Kansas Funeral Privacy Act and introduced it on his first day in office, which includes the establishment of a 150-foot buffer zone around funerals one hour before, during and two hours after the end of a service to prevent protestors from engaging in public demonstration. "This bill is designed to protect a constitutional right to privacy during the funeral of a family that's mourning a loved one," Goyle said. This was done in reaction to members of the Westboro Baptist Church picketing at the funerals of military casualties of the Iraq invasion and occupation. It became effective on April 10, 2008.

Goyle said third-party groups who attempt to influence the outcome of elections should be required to publicly disclose information about their finances. Under an amendment offered by Goyle, groups spending more than $500 a year on issue advertisements naming a particular state or local candidate 30 days before a primary or 60 days before a general election would be subject to reveal information about their spending and donors in financial reports being filed with the state. The amendment was opposed by conservatives as a violation of free speech.

Seven counties in Kansas have no pharmacy, and another 30 have only one each. State Rep. Mike O'Neal, R-Hutchinson, proposed an admendent for University of Kansas pharmacy school expansion, which Goyle supported saying, "This is a priority not just for KU, Lawrence and Wichita, but for the whole state."

Goyle successfully introduced House Bill 2374, which draws down $69 million in federal stimulus dollars for the state's Unemployment Insurance Trust Fund. The legislation makes three revisions to the current unemployment insurance statute:
 Adopt an alternate wage base period to be used when an individual does not qualify for benefits using the standard wage base period.
 Provide benefits to workers seeking part-time employment to qualify for federal stimulus money.
 Extend unemployment insurance benefits to cover workers while they receive state-approved job training.

As a state legislator, he listed his priorities as "no free lunches from lobbyists, educating our children, reducing health care costs, real solutions on energy, fighting for immigration reform," and "helping small businesses." According to state ethics officials, Goyle and State Sen. David Wysong, R-Mission Hills, are state lawmakers who received no direct attention from lobbyists.

2010 U.S. Congressional campaign

Goyle ran against Republican nominee Republican National Committeeman Mike Pompeo, Libertarian nominee Shawn Smith, and Reform Party nominee Susan G. Ducey for this open seat. Republican incumbent Todd Tiahrt decided to run in the U.S. Senator election in 2010, although he lost the nomination to Jerry Moran. Goyle won against Robert Tillman in the Democratic primary.

The seat was rated as "Likely Republican" by CQ Politics. In March 2010, the Democratic Congressional Campaign Committee added Goyle's name to its "Red to Blue" list of the strongest candidates running for Republican held seats. On August 12, 2010, SurveyUSA and KWCH-TV released a poll on the Kansas 4th Congressional district campaign between Pompeo and Goyle. According to the poll, in which 604 likely voters were interviewed, Pompeo led Goyle 49% to 42% with a margin of error of 4.1%. 
Pompeo's campaign-affiliated Twitter account shared, then deleted, a link to an article vilifying state Representative Raj Goyle, his Cleveland, Ohio-born, Indian-American opponent as, "Just like his evil Muslim communist USURPER comrad, Barrack Hussein Obama. This Goyle character is just another 'turban topper' who could be a muslim, a hindu, a buddhist etc who knows"..."we don't need in congress or any political office that deals with the US Constitution, Christianity and the United States of America!!!" Initially, Pompeo recommended the tweet as a "good read," ultimately resulting in Pompeo's apology. Pompeo's campaign subsequently featured billboards that read, "Vote American-Vote Pompeo," which drew similar criticism but remained in place.

On election day, Goyle was defeated by Pompeo by a large 22% margin, 58% to 36% in what was considered to be a nationally favorable climate for Republicans.

Personal life
On July 24, 2004, he married Monica Kumari Arora, an attorney and daughter of retired public school teachers in Middletown, Orange County, New York. The couple has two children.

References

External links
 Raj Goyle official Kansas Legislature site
 Raj Goyle for Congress official campaign site
 
Campaign contributions at OpenSecrets.org
 Profile at Kansas Votes

1975 births
Living people
Politicians from Hutchinson, Kansas
Politicians from Cleveland
Politicians from Wichita, Kansas
American Hindus
American politicians of Indian descent
Duke University alumni
Harvard Law School alumni
Wichita State University faculty
Democratic Party members of the Kansas House of Representatives
Asian-American people in Kansas politics
21st-century American politicians